Jerónimo António Badaraco Belem (born 15 November 1974) is a Macanese racing driver currently competing in the Macau Touring Car Championship. He is a former World Touring Car Championship driver, who made his debut in 2013.

Racing career
Badaraco began his career in 2007 in the Asian Touring Car Series. In 2011 he switched to the Macau Touring Car Championship. In 2013 Badaraco made his World Touring Car Championship debut with Son Veng Racing Team driving a Chevrolet Cruze LT in the last three rounds of the championship.

Racing record

Complete World Touring Car Championship results
(key) (Races in bold indicate pole position – 1 point awarded just in first race; races in italics indicate fastest lap – 1 point awarded all races; * signifies that driver led race for at least one lap – 1 point given all races)

References

External links
 

1974 births
Living people
World Touring Car Championship drivers
Macau racing drivers
Macanese people